The 15th British Independent Film Awards, held on 9 December 2012 at the Old Billingsgate Market in central London, honoured the best British independent films of 2012.

Awards

Best Director
Peter Strickland - Berberian Sound Studio
Bart Layton - The Imposter
Ben Wheatley - Sightseers
John Madden - The Best Exotic Marigold Hotel
Rufus Norris - Broken

The Douglas Hickox Award
Given to a British director on their debut feature.
Bart Layton - The Imposter
Ben Drew - Ill Manors
Rowan Athale - Wasteland
Rufus Norris - Broken
Sally El Hosaini - My Brother the Devil

Best Screenplay
Amy Jump, Alice Lowe and Steve Oram - Sightseers
Mark O'Rowe - Broken
Paul Andrew Williams - Song for Marion
Peter Strickland - Berberian Sound Studio
Abi Morgan - The Iron Lady

Best Actress
Andrea Riseborough - Shadow Dancer
Alice Lowe - Sightseers
Elle Fanning - Ginger and Rosa
Judi Dench - The Best Exotic Marigold Hotel
Meryl Streep - The Iron Lady

Best Supporting Actress
Olivia Colman - Hyde Park on Hudson
Vanessa Redgrave - Song for Marion
Maggie Smith - The Best Exotic Marigold Hotel
Eileen Davies - Sightseers
Alice Englert - Ginger and Rosa

Best Actor
Toby Jones - Berberian Sound Studio
Tim Roth - Broken
Terence Stamp - Song for Marion
Steve Oram - Sightseers
Riz Ahmed - Ill Manors

Best Supporting Actor
Rory Kinnear - Broken
Billy Connolly - Quartet
Cillian Murphy - Broken
Domhnall Gleeson - Shadow Dancer
Tom Wilkinson - The Best Exotic Marigold Hotel

Most Promising Newcomer
James Floyd - My Brother the Devil
Elliott Tittensor - Spike Island
Eloise Laurence - Broken
Paul Brannigan - The Angels' Share
Zawe Ashton - Dreams of a Life

Best Technical Achievement
Joakim Sundström - Sound Design - Berberian Sound Studio
Nic Knowland - Cinematographer - Berberian Sound Studio
Electric Wave Bureau - Music  - Broken
Robbie Ryan - Cinematographer - Ginger and Rosa
Andrew Hulme - Editor - The Imposter

Best Documentary
The Imposter
London: The Modern Babylon
Roman Polanski: A Film Memoir
Marley
Dreams of a Life

Best Achievement in Production
Berberian Sound Studio
Sightseers
The Sweeney
Ill Manors
The Imposter

Best Short Film
Volume
Friday
Junk
Swimmer
Skyborn

The Raindance Award
Strings
Love Tomorrow
Frank
Jason Becker: Not Dead Yet
City Slacker

Best Foreign Independent Film
The Hunt
Amour
Searching for Sugarman
Rust and Bone
Beasts of the Southern Wild

Best British Independent Film
Broken
Sightseers
The Best Exotic Marigold Hotel
The Imposter
Berberian Sound Studio

The Richard Harris Award
Michael Gambon

The Variety Award
Jude Law

The Special Jury Prize
Sandra Hebron

References

External links
 BIFA homepage

British Independent Film Awards
2012 film awards
2012 in British cinema
2012 in London
December 2012 events in the United Kingdom